Thebe is a feminine name mentioned several times in Greek mythology, in accounts that imply multiple female characters, four of whom are said to have had three cities named Thebes after them:

 Thebe, daughter of Asopus and Metope, who was said to have consorted with Zeus. Amphion and Zethus named Boeotian Thebes after her because of their kinship, the twins being sons of her sister Antiope by Zeus.
 Thebe, daughter of Zeus and Iodame, given in marriage to Ogygus. She was the sister of Deucalion, otherwise unknown.
Thebe, daughter of Zeus and Megacleite and sister of Locrus, the man who assisted Amphion and Zethus in the building of Thebes. She later on married Zethus.
 Thebe, daughter of Prometheus, and also a possible eponym of the Boeotian Thebes.
 Thebe, daughter of Cilix and thus, brother of Thasus. By Corybas, son of Cybele, she was the possible mother of Ida who begat Minos II by King Lycastus of Crete. This Thebe is possibly the eponym of Cilician Thebe.
 Thebe, eponym of Thebes, Egypt. She was the daughter of either Nilus, Epaphus, Proteus, or Libys, son of Epirus; rare versions of the myth make her a consort of Zeus and mother of Aegyptus or Heracles.
 Thebe, daughter of the Pelasgian Adramys, the eponym of Adramyttium, or of the river god Granicus. She married Heracles, who named Hypoplacian Thebes after her.
 Thebe, an Amazon. 
Thebe, alternate name for the Titaness Phoebe.

See also
 Thebe (disambiguation)

Notes

References 

 Apollodorus, The Library with an English Translation by Sir James George Frazer, F.B.A., F.R.S. in 2 Volumes, Cambridge, MA, Harvard University Press; London, William Heinemann Ltd. 1921. ISBN 0-674-99135-4. Online version at the Perseus Digital Library. Greek text available from the same website.
Diodorus Siculus, The Library of History translated by Charles Henry Oldfather. Twelve volumes. Loeb Classical Library. Cambridge, Massachusetts: Harvard University Press; London: William Heinemann, Ltd. 1989. Vol. 3. Books 4.59–8. Online version at Bill Thayer's Web Site
 Diodorus Siculus, Bibliotheca Historica. Vol 1-2. Immanel Bekker. Ludwig Dindorf. Friedrich Vogel. in aedibus B. G. Teubneri. Leipzig. 1888-1890. Greek text available at the Perseus Digital Library.
 Pausanias, Description of Greece with an English Translation by W.H.S. Jones, Litt.D., and H.A. Ormerod, M.A., in 4 Volumes. Cambridge, MA, Harvard University Press; London, William Heinemann Ltd. 1918. . Online version at the Perseus Digital Library
Pausanias, Graeciae Descriptio. 3 vols. Leipzig, Teubner. 1903.  Greek text available at the Perseus Digital Library.
 Pseudo-Clement, Recognitions from Ante-Nicene Library Volume 8, translated by Smith, Rev. Thomas. T. & T. Clark, Edinburgh. 1867. Online version at theio.com

Naiads
Nymphs
Mortal women of Zeus
Children of Zeus
Children of Asopus
Demigods in classical mythology
Women of Heracles
Children of Potamoi
Theban characters in Greek mythology